The Cathedral of the Sacred Heart of Jesus (in ) is a Roman Catholic church in Harbin, Heilongjiang Province, China.  Its official name is Sacred Heart of Jesus Diocesan Cathedral of Harbin.

General

Under construction
Sacred Heart Cathedral of Harbin is a Roman Catholic church in Harbin, Heilongjiang Province, China.

The church's history can be summarized as follows:
 ca. 1900, while China Eastern Railway being built, many Polish people came to Harbin to work.  The greater majority of them were Catholics.
 1906 - The cornerstone was set by the priest Dominik Przyluski and the construction of a Catholic church began. It was completed and dedicated in the following year. The church was also called Polish Catholic Church or East Dazhi Avenue Catholic Church
 Thereafter, the church came under St. Petersburg, Vladivostok,  Beijing and Jilin Dioceses
 1959 - The church became the diocesan cathedral of Heilongjiang Diocese
 1966 - During the Cultural Revolution, the church building was abolished
 2004 - The church building was re-built

The address of the church is: No. 211, East Dazhi Avenue, Nangang District, Harbin.  Phone: 0451-5365-3007.  The church is located in the "church street", north east of "Hongbo Square' (where Czar Nicolas' Central Church was), on East Dazhi Avenue, where there are also Harbin Nangang Christian Church (Protestant) and Church of the Intercession in Harbin (Eastern Orthodox).

See also
 Christianity and Catholicism
 Christianity in China
 Roman Catholicism in China
 Chinese Patriotic Catholic Association
 List of Catholic cathedrals in China
 Some Christian churches in Northeast China:
Catholic: Dalian Catholic Church, Sacred Heart Cathedral of Shenyang, St. Theresa's Cathedral of Changchun, Sacred Heart Cathedral of Harbin, etc.; Protestant: Dalian Yuguang Street Church, Shenyang Dongguan Church, Changchun Christian Church, Harbin Nangang Christian Church, etc.; and Eastern Orthodox: Church of the Intercession in Harbin, etc.

References

Roman Catholic churches completed in 1926
20th-century Roman Catholic church buildings in China
Roman Catholic cathedrals in China
Churches in Harbin
1926 establishments in China
Polish diaspora in Asia